Washington Beltrán Mullin (6 April 1914, Montevideo – 19 February 2003) was a Uruguayan political figure.

Background
A journalist by profession, and son of deputy Washington Beltrán Barbat, who was killed in 1920 in a duel with former Colorado President José Batlle y Ordóñez, Washington Beltrán was a prominent member of the National (Blanco) Party (for some decades he joined the Independent National Party).

He was elected to the Senate in 1958. From 1961, he also served as co-director of the newspaper El País, which was founded by his father.

President of the Uruguayan National Council of Government
Elected in 1958 as a member of the National Council of Government, Beltrán presided over that body from 1965 till 1966, succeeding Luis Giannattasio who had died in office shortly after attending in official capacity the funeral of Winston Churchill.

Post presidency
In 1966, Beltrán was succeeded as President by Alberto Héber Usher. He was re-elected to the senate in 1966, and retired from politics following the coup by Juan María Bordaberry.

In 1987 he was appointed Ambassador to the Holy See.

The rivalry between the Uruguayan Blanco and Colorado parties was a feature of the country's history for more than a century, and, indeed, an intense part of Beltrán's family history. However, in the second round of the 1999 elections, the Blanco Beltrán publicly supported Colorado Jorge Batlle Ibáñez for the presidency against Tabaré Vazquez.

Death

Beltrán died on 19 February 2003. He is buried at the Central Cemetery of Montevideo.

See also
 Politics of Uruguay
 List of political families in Uruguay
 Luis Giannattasio#1965: Death in office

References

External links
Photo

1914 births
2003 deaths
Uruguayan people of Spanish descent
Uruguayan people of Irish descent
Uruguayan people of German descent
People from Montevideo
National Party (Uruguay) politicians
Presidents of the National Council of Government (Uruguay)
Uruguayan journalists
20th-century Uruguayan lawyers
University of the Republic (Uruguay) alumni
Ambassadors of Uruguay to the Holy See
Burials at the Central Cemetery of Montevideo
Independent National Party (Uruguay) politicians
20th-century journalists